The name Meari has been used to name four tropical cyclones in the northwestern Pacific Ocean. It was submitted by North Korea and means "echo".

 Typhoon Meari (2004) (T0421, 25W, Quinta) – struck Japan.
 Tropical Storm Meari (2011) (T1105, 07W, Falcon) – approached Korea.
 Typhoon Meari (2016) (T1623, 26W) – churned in the open ocean.
 Tropical Storm Meari (2022) (T2208, 09W) – the brushed the southern coast of Japan without causing major impacts.

Pacific typhoon set index articles